Marine Geodesy is an academic journal published by Taylor & Francis about "ocean surveys, [ocean] mapping, and remote sensing".
Its editor-in-chief is Rongxing (Ron) Li;
its 2019 impact factor is 1.322.

References

Taylor & Francis academic journals
Oceanography journals
Remote sensing journals
Geodesy